Lili Árkayné Sztehló (7 November 1897 – 28 October 1959 in Budapest) was a Hungarian painter and artist, wife of Bertalan Árkay, best known for her stained glass window paintings in parish churches and cathedrals throughout Hungary.

Biography
She graduated from the Academy of Fine Arts studying under Lajos Deák Ébner, János Vaszary and Oszkár Glatz in 1923, later making scholarly trips to Rome and Paris. Initially, she was successful with her oil paintings, but by her late 20s she had become productive mainly in the field of ceramics and glass painting. Her major works include the glass windows of the City Hall of Mohács commemorating the Battle of Mohács (1927), the painted glass windows of the Pasarét Church and Heart of Jesus Church in Városmajor
 in Budapest (1932) and of the Gyárváros Church in Győr (1929), the window of St. Stephen's Mausoleum in Székesfehérvár (1938), the glass windows of the inner city church of Pécs (1943), and of the Saint Michael Cathedral in Veszprém (1954). Air raids during the Second World War caused serious damage to these works.

Árkayné Sztehló participated in a number of national and foreign applied arts exhibitions, including Monza in 1930, Rome in 1934, winning gold medals and the Grand Prix. In 1937 she exposed at the Exposition Internationale des Arts et Techniques dans la Vie Moderne in Paris.
She exposed in 1940 at the Triennale di Milano a stained glass depicting Elizabeth of Hungary.

She died in 1959.

Stained glass windows in the Galyatető Roman Catholic Church

References

Sources
 Biography of Lili Árkayné Sztehló on artportal

Hungarian ceramists
1897 births
1959 deaths
Artists from Budapest
Hungarian women painters
Glass artists
Women glass artists
20th-century Hungarian painters
20th-century Hungarian women artists
20th-century ceramists
Hungarian women ceramists